The 2015–16 Nemzeti Bajnokság I, also known as NB I, is the 117th season of top-tier football in Hungary. The league is officially named OTP Bank Liga for sponsorship reasons. The season began 17 July 2015 and will conclude on 8 May 2016. Videoton are the defending champions having won their second Hungarian championship last season.

Last season an extra four teams were relegated to the Nemzeti Bajnokság III. Győr had financial and licensing issues. Kecskemét, Pécs and Nyíregyháza all had licensing issues. Therefore, from this season twelve teams compete for the championship title, playing 33 rounds.

Teams
Dunaújváros and Pápa finished the 2014–15 season in the last two places and thus were relegated to NB II division.

The two relegated teams were replaced with the champions and the runners-up 2014–15 NB II Vasas and Békéscsaba. Each of the first two teams in the first division.

Stadium and locations

Following is the list of clubs competing in 2015–16 Nemzeti Bajnokság I, with their location, stadium and stadium capacity.

Personnel and kits
Following is the list of clubs competing in 2015–16 Nemzeti Bajnokság I, with their manager, captain, kit manufacturer and shirt sponsor.

Note: Flags indicate national team as has been defined under FIFA eligibility rules. Players and Managers may hold more than one non-FIFA nationality.

Sources:

Managerial changes

League table

Positions by round

Results
In the first 22 rounds every team plays against each other home-and-away in a round-robin format. In the remaining 11 rounds, the first six placed team from the previous season will play six matches at home and five matches away, and the other six teams will play five matches at home and six matches away.

Rounds 1–22

Rounds 23–33

Season statistics

Top goalscorers

Updated to games played on 30 April 2016

Hat-tricks

Best players

Attendances

Number of teams by counties

Best players

After the season Magyar Labdarúgó Szövetség chose the best players of this season.

The best player: Zoltán Gera (Ferencváros)
The best discovered player of this season: Ádám Nagy (Ferencváros)
The best manager: Thomas Doll (Ferencváros)
The best referee: Viktor Kassai
Fair Play: Debreceni VSC
The most aesthetically significant, or "most beautiful", goal of NB1 (Audience Award): Dániel Böde (Ferencváros)

See also
 2015–16 Magyar Kupa
 2015–16 Nemzeti Bajnokság II
 2015–16 Nemzeti Bajnokság III

References

External links
  
 Official rules 
 uefa.com

Nemzeti Bajnokság I seasons
1
Hungary